Grobelce is a settlement in the Municipality of Šmarje pri Jelšah in eastern Slovenia. It lies in the northern part of the Kozje region in the traditional region of Styria. The municipality is included in the Savinja Statistical Region.

References

External links
Grobelce at Geopedia

Populated places in the Municipality of Šmarje pri Jelšah